Khimsar Fort is located near Khinvsar village, in the Nagaur district of Rajasthan in India, halfway between Jodhpur and Nagaur, on the eastern edge of the Thar Desert. The fortress was built in 1523 by Rao Karamsji, the 8th son of Rao Jodha of Jodhpur. Aurangzeb use to stay here while in Nagaur.

References 

 Khimsar Fort
 Cheryl Bently, A Guide to the Palace Hotels of India, Hunter Publishing Inc., 2011

Tourist attractions in Nagaur district
1523 establishments in India